Matthew Scott Dominguez (born August 28, 1989) is an American former professional baseball third baseman. He played in Major League Baseball (MLB) for the Florida Marlins, Houston Astros, and Toronto Blue Jays and in Nippon Professional Baseball (NPB) for the Chiba Lotte Marines.

Early career
Dominguez was born in Van Nuys, California, to Fernando and Cindy Dominguez. His father is a Los Angeles Times copy editor.

He was drafted out of Chatsworth High School by the Marlins with the 12th overall pick in the 2007 Major League Baseball draft.

Professional career

Minor leagues
Dominguez was assigned to the Rookie level Gulf Coast League Marlins after the draft. After 5 games, he was promoted to the Short Season-A Jamestown Jammers for the remainder of the season. He batted .158 with 1 home run and 6 RBI in 15 total games in 2007. Dominguez played the entire 2008 season with the Class-A Greensboro Grasshoppers, and in 88 games played, hit .296 with 18 home runs and 70 RBI. He split the 2009 season with the Advanced-A Jupiter Hammerheads and Double-A Jacksonville Suns. In 134 total games played, Dominguez hit .247 with 13 home runs and 62 RBI. He was named a mid-season All-Star for Jupiter. In the offseason, Dominguez would play with the Mesa Solar Sox of the Arizona Fall League (AFL), and despite hitting only .188 in 12 games, was named a Rising Star by the AFL.

In 2010, Dominguez was assigned to Jacksonville for the entire season. He participated in the Double-A All-Star Game that season, and was named the game's Top Star. In 138 games played, he hit .252 with 14 home runs and 81 RBI. He was also named a post-season All-Star, and an MiLB.com Organization All-Star for the Marlins. Dominguez battled injuries in the 2011 season, playing in 87 games for the Triple-A New Orleans Zephyrs, but also making rehab appearances for Jupiter and Jacksonville. Dominguez would hit .249 in 2011, along with 12 home runs and 58 RBI, before being called up by the Marlins for the first time in his career. In the offseason, he played in 21 games for the Surprise Saguaros in the AFL, batting .226 with 4 home runs and 19 RBI, and was again named an AFL Rising Star.

Major League career

Florida Marlins
Dominguez was called up to the majors for the first time on September 6, 2011. He made his debut as a pinch hitter that day against the New York Mets. The next day, He got his first major league hit off of Mets' pitcher R. A. Dickey.

Houston Astros
Dominguez began the 2012 season in Triple-A New Orleans, and hit .234 in 78 games. He was traded, along with Rob Rasmussen, to the Houston Astros for Carlos Lee on July 4, 2012. He played the next day against the Pittsburgh Pirates and went 0–2. On July 9, Dominguez was sent to the Triple-A Oklahoma City RedHawks, after playing 4 games with the Astros. He hit two home runs in a game against the Texas Rangers. He made the Astros' major league roster in 2013 and 2014, but was sent down to the minors before the start of the 2015 season, losing his starting spot to Luis Valbuena, who was acquired by the Astros in January. In 2013, he hit for a .241 batting average, along with 21 home runs, and 77 runs batted in. The next season, he slumped to a .215 average, 16 home runs, and 57 RBIs. He was designated for assignment on June 8, 2015.

Milwaukee Brewers
Dominguez was claimed off waivers by the Milwaukee Brewers on June 16, 2015, and was assigned to Triple-A Colorado Springs Sky Sox. In 72 games played for the Sky Sox in 2015, he hit .281 with 6 home runs and 30 RBI, and won an MiLB Gold Glove.

Toronto Blue Jays
On September 6, 2015, Dominguez was claimed by the Toronto Blue Jays, and optioned to the Triple-A Buffalo Bisons. Dominguez attended 2016 Major League spring training, and was optioned to the Bisons on March 18, 2016. He was recalled by the Blue Jays on April 26, and started at third base against the Chicago White Sox that night. Following a 3–1 victory over the Texas Rangers on May 3, Dominguez was optioned back to Triple-A Buffalo. On June 5, he was recalled by the Blue Jays. Dominguez was placed on optional waivers on June 7. On September 2, Dominguez was designated for assignment to make room for Matt Dermody. Dominguez appeared in five games for the Blue Jays in 2016, going hitless in 11 at-bats.

Boston Red Sox
On December 13, 2016, Dominguez signed a minor league contract with the Boston Red Sox that included an invitation to spring training.

Chiba Lotte Marines
He elected free agency on November 6, 2017, and signed with the Chiba Lotte Marines of Nippon Professional Baseball on December 23. He became a free agent after the 2018 season.

See also
 Houston Astros award winners and league leaders

References

External links

1989 births
Living people
American expatriate baseball players in Canada
American expatriate baseball players in Japan
Baseball players from Los Angeles
Buffalo Bisons (minor league) players
Chiba Lotte Marines players
Colorado Springs Sky Sox players
Florida Marlins players
Fresno Grizzlies players
Greensboro Grasshoppers players
Gulf Coast Marlins players
Houston Astros players
Jacksonville Suns players
Jamestown Jammers players
Jupiter Hammerheads players
Major League Baseball third basemen
Mesa Solar Sox players
New Orleans Zephyrs players
Nippon Professional Baseball third basemen
Oklahoma City RedHawks players
Pawtucket Red Sox players
People from Van Nuys, Los Angeles
Surprise Saguaros players
Toronto Blue Jays players
Chatsworth High School alumni